Vatankhah is a surname. Notable people with the surname include:

Büyük Vatankhah (born 1943), Iranian footballer and manager
Reza Vatankhah (born 1947), Iranian footballer and manager, brother of Büyük